The 1958 Chico State Wildcats football team represented Chico State College—now known as California State University, Chico—as a member of the Far Western Conference (FWC) during the 1958 NCAA College Division football season. Led by first-year head coach George Maderos, Chico State compiled an overall record of 5–5 with a mark of 2–3 in conference play, tying for fourth place in the FWC. The team was outscored by its opponents 192 to 162 for the season. The Wildcats played home games at College Field in Chico, California.

Schedule

Notes

References

Chico State
Chico State Wildcats football seasons
Chico State Wildcats football